The Monza–Molteno railway is a railway line in Lombardy, Italy.

The line was opened as a private railway on 14 October 1911.

The only train service is the S7 Milano-Monza-Molteno-Lecco line of Milan suburban railway service.
 
Monza is connected to Lecco even with another railway, the main railway Milano-Monza-Carnate-Lecco, more short and faster with a large number of trains; Milano-Monza-Molteno-Lecco train ("Treno dei Tre Parchi", Train of the Three Parks) runs through a more long, slow way across the hilly area of Brianza - Colli Briantei - the countryside, near beautiful meadows, torrents and rivers, woods, fields, small lake and high mountains close to Lecco, and old small towns with palaces of nobility and places of history, culture, and art.

See also 
 List of railway lines in Italy

References

Footnotes

Sources
 
 
 
  
 Trenord: 2019 time-table.

Railway lines in Lombardy
Railway lines opened in 1911
1911 establishments in Italy